Michelle Charles is a politician who is a Member of the Parliament of Jamaica. She defeated Fenton Ferguson in Saint Thomas Eastern at the 2020 general election.

Personal life 
She is daughter of former speaker Pearnel Charles.

References 

Living people
Jamaica Labour Party politicians
People from Saint Thomas Parish, Jamaica
21st-century Jamaican politicians
21st-century Jamaican women politicians
Members of the House of Representatives of Jamaica
Year of birth missing (living people)
Members of the 14th Parliament of Jamaica